Bid Zard (also Romanized as Bīd Zard) is a village in Tashan-e Gharbi Rural District, Tashan District, Behbahan County, Khuzestan Province, Iran. At the 2006 census, its population was 318, in 64 families.

References 

Populated places in Behbahan County